Aushik Srinivas (born 16 March 1993) is a cricketer who plays for Tamil Nadu in Indian domestic cricket. He is a slow left-arm orthodox bowler. He made his first-class debut in 2009 at the age of 16.

He studies B. Tech at SRM Institute of Science and Technology. A prodigious talent who has been consistent from the time he started playing for the Tamil Nadu Ranji Team. He is well known for technic to keep the batsmen tight at one end. He took 4,5,8 wicket haul in 2016 TNCA club matches standing leading wicket taker for the season.

He has bowled a marathon 85 overs in an innings against Rajasthan and had played a vital role in Tamil Nadu finishing Runners up in the 2011-12 Ranji Trophy.

References

External links 
Aushik Srinivas - Cricinfo profile

Indian cricketers
Tamil Nadu cricketers
South Zone cricketers
1993 births
Living people
People from Coimbatore